Lady Elizabeth Campbell (born 24 September 1959), known as Liza Campbell, is an artist, calligrapher, columnist, and writer, born in the north of Scotland and currently living in London, England. She is the second daughter of Hugh Campbell, 6th Earl Cawdor (1932–1993), by his first wife, the former Cathryn Hinde. She is the last child of an Earl Cawdor to have been born at Cawdor Castle, which has previously been erroneously associated with Shakespeare's Macbeth. (Her older sister Lady Emma Campbell was also born there, but her brothers and younger sister were born elsewhere, as were the children of the present Earl.)

Campbell was raised in Cawdor Castle during the Sixties, and studied art at Chelsea.  She lived in Mauritius, Kenya (Nairobi) and in Indonesia between 1990 and 1996.

Career 
As an artist, Liza Campbell worked in an art gallery, and has had exhibitions of engraved soapstone at All Saints Gallery, Babbington House and the Sladmore Gallery. More recently, she has shown collages at the Michael Naimski Gallery and had exhibitions at the Rebecca Hossack Art Gallery. 

For four years, from 2000, she wrote a back page column Adventures of a Past It Girl.

Family
Campbell was the second of five children, and the second daughter of three daughters. Her parents divorced in 1979 after 22 years of marriage.

She dated Pakistani cricketer (now Pakistan prime minister) Imran Khan for several years. In 1990, she married William Robert Charles "Willie" Athill, a big-game fisherman, with whom she lived on a desert island for two years. By that marriage, she has two children, a daughter Storm (b. 1990) and a son Atticus (b. 1992).  She is now divorced from Athill, the marriage having broken down in 1993. Her daughter married Richard Hollingsworth in September 2021.

On 22 June 2013 the New York Times quoted Campbell in an article that described the law of primogeniture as a legacy instance of sexism, “The posh aspect of it blinds people to what is essentially sexism in a privileged minority, where girls are born less than boys.”
Campbell noted that she loved her younger brother, but called his inheritance of the title and estate a “peculiar situation.”  Campbell quoted her father's advice on auto safety -- “Remember to wear a safety belt, because your face is your fortune.”

See also 

 Cawdor Castle
 Earls Cawdor

References

External links 
 Liza Campbell official site. Last accessed .
 Liza Campbell. "My week: Liza Campbell" article, published 13 August 2006 in The Observer briefly mentions her relationship with her father and his second wife. Retrieved 13 August 2007.
 Nigel Farndale "My nightmares in Macbeth's castle" in The Daily Telegraph published 3 March 2006.  Retrieved 13 August 2007.
 Liza Campbell.  " I'm not just a chromosomal faux pas" in The Daily Telegraph published 19 January 2004. Retrieved 13 August 2007.
 Martin Hodgson and Stephen Khan.  published in The Independent on 4 June 2006. Retrieved 13 August 2007.

1959 births
Living people
Liza Campbell
Daughters of British earls
Scottish artists
Scottish autobiographers
Scottish female models
Scottish socialites
Scottish women artists
Scottish women writers